Road to Kingdom is a television program that aired every Thursday at 20:00 (KST) on Mnet from April 30 to June 18, 2020. It is known as the first part of the male counterpart of Queendom, and the prequel of Kingdom.

A press conference for the program was held on April 21.

The Boyz became the winner of the competition, hence securing a spot in the upcoming program Kingdom (킹덤).

Overview
The program is a battle for a spot in Kingdom (킹덤) between 7 boy groups with potential, but are mostly unknown to many. Similar to Queendom, there will be Comeback Singles (newly produced songs) released, on June 12, 2020.

Special interview clips with Queendom contestants Park Bom, AOA (Chanmi), Mamamoo (Solar, Hwasa), Lovelyz (Mijoo, Kei), Oh My Girl (Hyojung, YooA) and (G)I-DLE (Soyeon, Yuqi) were shown in episode 1, as they share their first thoughts about Road to Kingdom.

The number hints, which were given 1 week before the first recording of the show, are shown as follow:
 1 boy group will advance to Kingdom, as part of winning the show; the number "1" also means the evaluation standards to be used
 2 boy groups eliminated throughout the show
 4 performances (however, not all 7 boy groups will perform in all 4 performances)
 7 boy groups
 90 Seconds Performances (Preliminary Performances)

Rules
 There will be 2 boy groups to be eliminated throughout the show:
 1 boy group will be eliminated when they obtain the lowest cumulative points of the 1st and 2nd performances
 1 boy group (out of the remaining 6) will be eliminated when they obtain the lowest cumulative points after the 3rd performances
 The overall final ranking of the show (for the remaining 5 boy groups in the final performances) is based on the following criteria:
 3 preliminary performances (1st Performance - 10,000 points, 2nd Performance - 10,000 points, 3rd Performance - 15,000 points)
 Video views points (based on the number of views of the performances videos (Full Version only) on YouTube and Naver TV; maximum of 15,000 points)
 Digital points of the Comeback Singles calculated from the time of release till June 16, 2020, at 23:59 (KST) (maximum of 15,000 points)
 Finale live comeback stages text message votes (domestic and international fans' votes; maximum of 35,000 points)
 The overall 1st placed boy group will be able to take part in Kingdom.
 The boy group which does not rank 1st overall, but ranking 1st in only the Final Live Performances, can also advance to take part in Kingdom. 
 In the event of 1 boy group having both 1st overall and 1st in only the Final Live Performances, the said boy group will be the only boy group to take part in Kingdom.

Preliminary Performances - 90 Seconds Performances
The 7 boy groups each perform a 90 seconds performance that best express themselves.

There is no order decided before the performances - the order is decided on the spot. The first performing boy group is decided by the boy group that volunteers themselves first. After the first boy group has performed, they will decide on the second performing boy group, and the second boy group that has performed will then decide on the third performing boy group. The process goes on until all performances have been completed.

The round's points are entirely decided through a self-evaluation where each boy group will rank the other boy groups' performances from 1st to 6th.
 1st place: 100 points
 2nd place: 80 points
 3rd place: 60 points
 4th place: 40 points
 5th place: 20 points
 6th place: 5 points

Each boy group would receive self-evaluation points from the other 6 boy groups, and they will be added up to become the round's total points obtained for the boy group. This will, however, be not included in the overall points for the show.

1st Performances - Song of King
The 7 boy groups each perform one song from their boy group seniors, and is rearranged into a different style.

Rules
 The 1st placed boy group for the 90 Seconds Performances will get a benefit of arranging the cue sheet for this round of performances.
 The round's points are entirely decided through a self-evaluation, where each boy group's members will rank the other boy groups' performances from 1st to 6th.
 1st place: 100 points
 2nd place: 80 points
 3rd place: 60 points
 4th place: 40 points
 5th place: 20 points
 6th place: 5 points
 As ONF and Oneus each have only 6 members, the remaining 5 boy groups will each send 6 of their members to vote for this round. (Total of 42 boy group members voting in this round)
 Each boy group would receive self-evaluation points from the other 6 boy groups' 36 members, and they will be added up to become the round's total points obtained for the boy group.
 The 1st placed boy group gets the full 10,000 points, and the remaining boy groups will each get points based on the proportion of their self-evaluation points to the self-evaluation points of the 1st placed boy group.

2nd Performances - My Song
The 7 boy groups each perform one of their representative hit songs, that is rearranged and different from their usual stages of the song.

Rules
 The 1st placed boy group for the 1st Performances will get a benefit of arranging the cue sheet for this round of performances. However, the other boy groups do not find out their own spots, nor the ones of the others, in the cue sheet until the day of the performances.
 The round's points are decided through 2 categories:
 Self-evaluation that was used for the 1st Performances voting, where each boy group would receive points from the other 6 boy groups' 36 members. (30% of the points for this round)
 Online audience votes from 140 individuals. Each boy group will gather 20 individuals, and each individual only gets to vote for the top 3 performances in this round. (70% of the points for this round)
 The 1st placed boy group gets the full 10,000 points, and the remaining boy groups will each get points based on the proportion of their total points obtained to the total points obtained for the 1st placed boy group.

3rd Performances - Part 1 (Collaboration) + Part 2 (Your Song)
The 6 remaining boy groups will have 2 performances for this round: the first being a collaboration performance, and the second being the performance of a song chosen by another boy group.

Rules (Collaboration)
 The 3 pairs of boy groups were matched by random picking of one boy group, followed by random picking of the next boy group to be paired with the boy group picked earlier on. The process goes on to form the remaining 2 pairs.
 There are no restrictions in the number of members each boy group would involve and their song choices.
 The round's points are decided through 2 categories:
 Self-evaluation, where each boy group will send 6 members (total of 36 boy group members voting) and rank the 3 collaboration performances. (30% of the points for this round)
 Online audience votes from 120 individuals. Each boy group will gather 20 individuals, and each individual ranks the 3 performances in this round. (70% of the points for this round)
 1st place - 10 points, 2nd place - 5 points, 3rd place - 1 point
 The 1st placed collaboration performance gets the full 5,000 points each for the boy groups involved, 3,000 each for the boy groups involved in the 2nd placed collaboration performance, and 1,000 each for the boy groups involved in the 3rd placed collaboration performance.

Rules (Your Song)
 The 6 remaining boy groups each pick a song, with no restriction, for this round.
 The songs chosen will each then be allocated to another boy group, but only within the pairings that were formed for the Collaboration round.
 The 1st placed boy group for the 2nd Performances will get a benefit of arranging the cue sheet for this round of performances. However, the other boy groups do not find out their own spots, nor the ones of the others, in the cue sheet until the day of the performances.
 The round's points are decided through 2 categories:
 Self-evaluation, where each boy group will send 6 members (total of 36 boy group members voting). (30% of the points for this round)
 Online audience votes from 120 individuals. Each boy group will gather 20 individuals, and each individual would only vote for the top 3 performances in this round. (70% of the points for this round)
 The 1st placed boy group gets the full 10,000 points, and the remaining boy groups will each get points based on the proportion of their total points obtained to the total points obtained for the 1st placed boy group.

Final Live Comeback Stages
The 5 remaining boy groups will each perform a newly produced song live.

 For this round, live votes will be allocated in the following distribution:
 Domestic fans' text message votes (70% of the live votes)
 International fans' voting through the Whosfan application (30% of the live votes)
 In addition, the following categories are also considered to decide the final winner:
 Total points accumulated in the Performances prior to the finale (except for the 90 Seconds Performances)
 View counts of the performance videos on YouTube and Naver TV
 Digital points of the Comeback Singles calculated (from time of release to June 16, 2020, at 23:59 (KST))

Cast

Hosts
 Lee Da-hee
 Jang Sung-kyu

Contestants
 Pentagon
 ONF
 Golden Child
 The Boyz
 Verivery
 Oneus
 TOO (later known as TO1)

Episodes

 Eliminated from the show

 Eliminated from the show

Elimination table
Color key:

Discography

Song of King Part 1

Song of King Part 2

My Song Part 1

My Song Part 2

Your Song Part 1

Your Song Part 2

Road to Kingdom FINAL

Ratings
Some of the ratings found have already been rounded off to 1 decimal place, as they are usually of lower rankings in terms of the day's ratings.

Sequel
On October 29, 2020, Mnet confirmed that the sequel of the show, Kingdom (킹덤), targets to begin its broadcast by first half of 2021.

Notes

References

External links 
  (in Korean) 
 

2020 South Korean television series debuts
2020 South Korean television series endings
Korean-language television shows
Music competitions in South Korea
South Korean reality television series
South Korean music television shows
Mnet (TV channel) original programming
Reality music competition television series
K-pop television series